Savaştepe is a town and district of Balıkesir Province in the Marmara region of Turkey. The population was 9,352 in 2010. The mayor is Turhan Şimşek (AKP).

References

External links
 District municipality's official website 
 Ercüment ÇALI 

Populated places in Balıkesir Province